The 2010 United States Senate election in Arizona took place on November 2, 2010, along with other elections to the United States Senate in other states as well as elections to the United States House of Representatives and various state and local elections. The primaries were held on August 24, 2010. Incumbent Republican U.S. Senator John McCain, who had lost the 2008 United States presidential election to then-United States Senator from Illinois  Barack Obama, ran for reelection to a fifth term and won. , this was the last time the counties of Coconino and Pima voted for the Republican candidate.

Republican primary

Background 

Incumbent Republican senator John McCain lost his bid for President of the United States in the 2008 election on November 4, 2008. By November 18, he had indicated his intention to form a political action committee to run for Senate re-election in 2010. McCain confirmed his decision at a press conference in Phoenix, Arizona, on November 25, 2008, saying, "I intend to run again and will make an announcement at an appropriate time." In his appearance, McCain made a point of shifting from discussion of national issues to local ones, and followed up with renewed attention to the state during the next few months. In February 2009, McCain began active fundraising efforts for his re-election campaign.

McCain faced a possible Republican primary challenge. He had won less than half the votes against the field of candidates in the 2008 Arizona Republican presidential primary, and had only won the presidential contest in Arizona by 8.5 percentage points. The person most mentioned as a possible primary challenger was radio talk show host and former U.S. Congressman J. D. Hayworth, who was being urged to run by his listeners. (Hayworth had once been allied with McCain and had supported his 2000 presidential campaign, but the two diverged ideologically shortly thereafter.) However, McCain's strong opposition to the economic stimulus package of 2009 warmed some conservatives to him and made a primary challenge less likely.

As 2009 progressed, McCain got two announced primary challengers, U.S. Navy veteran and businessman Jim Deakin, and Chris Simcox, the co-founder of the Minuteman Civil Defense Corps. Simcox's April 2009 announcement of his candidacy garnered a fair amount of press attention; he stated that "John McCain has failed miserably in his duty to secure this nation's borders and protect the people of Arizona from the escalating violence and lawlessness. ... Coupled with his votes for reckless bailout spending and big government solutions to our nation's problems, John McCain is out of touch with everyday Arizonans. Enough is enough."

In October 2009, Hayworth said that he was considering a primary challenge: "There's a great deal of respect for John as a historical figure. But he's long been at odds with the conservative base of the Republican Party and more recently with Arizonans." Hayworth quoted a poll which said that 61 percent of Arizona Republicans thought McCain had lost touch with his party. McCain had raised $4.7million for his Senate re-election, and had access to more than $20million left over from his 2008 presidential effort. A November 2009 Rasmussen Reports poll surprisingly showed that Hayworth was nearly even with McCain among likely Republican Party primary voters in the state. As January 2010 progressed, McCain began running negative ads against Hayworth. On January 22, 2010, Hayworth resigned from his talk radio position at KFYI, a necessary step to becoming a candidate. On January 23, Hayworth announced at a meeting of the Arizona Republican Party State Committee that he did intend to run, and that a formal announcement would be forthcoming soon.

As the contest began, some elements of the Tea Party movement supported Hayworth, but others stayed out of the contest, and still others supported Jim Deakin. The threat from Hayworth helped account for McCain's sometimes-awkward reversals or softpedallings of his former positions on issues such as the bank bailouts, national security, campaign finance reform, and gays in the military; Hayworth said, "John is undergoing a campaign conversion." McCain remained strong among party centrists and independents, and had strong financial resources. McCain also had the endorsements of the entire Arizona congressional delegation. Regardless, pundits predicted it would become "one of the country's fiercest political contests of 2010."

Hayworth officially launched his bid on February 15, 2010, in Phoenix. His announcement led Simcox to drop his campaign and endorse Hayworth, saying that he wanted to present a united conservative front. Hayworth attracted the support of a good number of top-rated radio talk show hosts, including Michael Savage. Hayworth called for a series of 10 debates between himself and McCain. This echoed a proposal that McCain had unsuccessfully made to Obama during their 2008 presidential campaign; this time, McCain labeled the idea a "desperate publicity stunt." With Hayworth using the campaign slogan "The Consistent Conservative," McCain backed off his reputation for unorthodoxy, saying, "I never considered myself a maverick. I consider myself a person who serves the people of Arizona to the best of his abilities." McCain's former vice presidential running mate, Sarah Palin, staged a campaign appearance with him in late March; she said that McCain was deserving of support among Tea Party movement-types. Many in the crowd came to see Palin rather than McCain and were unsure of whom they would vote for in the primary.

Both candidates endorsed Arizona SB 1070, the anti-illegal immigration state law passed in April 2010 that aroused national controversy, and both made tough stands on border control central to their campaigns. McCain retained a financial edge, having $4.6million in hand at the end of the first quarter to Hayworth's $861,000.

Hayworth's campaign began to struggle when infomercials he had made in 2007 came to light, which had pitched access to free government payment programs from a company that was accused of swindling thousands of people. McCain ran television ads that labeled Hayworth a "huckster," and in return Hayworth's wife charged McCain with engaging in deliberate character assassination. Hayworth also had difficulty rallying conservative backing due to his past support for Congressional earmarks and for his past associations with lobbyist Jack Abramoff.

Hayworth was further harmed by stating that the United States never declared war on Germany during the Second World War, when in fact it did on December 11, 1941.

During the summer, McCain began running immigration-themed ads featuring Pinal County sheriff Paul Babeu, who is also a strong supporter of SB 1070; however, Hayworth asked McCain to withdraw the ads because Babeu had recently appeared on the white nationalist radio show The Political Cesspool.

Candidates 
 John McCain, incumbent U.S. Senator
 Jim Deakin, businessman
 J. D. Hayworth, former U.S. Representative

Polling

Endorsements

Results

Democratic primary

Background 
Many considered popular Democratic Governor Janet Napolitano a possible Democratic challenger to McCain, and some very early polling showed her ahead or competitive with him in a prospective 2010 matchup. Napolitano was term-limited as governor in 2010, and had openly discussed the possibility of a Senate race, especially given McCain's 2008 electoral results in the Democratic-trending state.

However, Napolitano was nominated by President-elect Barack Obama to be the new Secretary of Homeland Security on December 1, 2008, making it appear unlikely that she would challenge McCain.

In February 2009, Arizona Senate minority leader Jorge Luis Garcia was saying: "There hasn't been any discussion about any [candidates]. The Democratic Party would be willing to lend support to a candidate against Senator McCain. It would be very expensive—very, very, very expensive." In April 2009, only one person had announced a candidacy, Rudy Garcia, the former mayor of Bell Gardens, California. In October 2009, national Democratic leaders were saying that they were not bothering to recruit anyone to face McCain, but that same month, Tucson Councilman Rodney Glassman filed an exploratory committee for this Senate seat at the urging of Arizona Attorney General and Arizona gubernatorial candidate Terry Goddard.

Other possible Democratic challengers mentioned have included Phoenix mayor Phil Gordon, U.S. Congresswoman Gabby Giffords, and Terry Goddard. However, Goddard had formally announced his candidacy for the 2010 Arizona gubernatorial race, and Phil Gordon was exploring a run for John Shadegg's Congressional seat in Arizona's 3rd district.

Candidates 
 Rodney Glassman, Tucson City Councilman
 John Dougherty, former investigative reporter for Phoenix New Times
 Cathy Eden, former state legislator and an aide to Governors Rose Mofford and Janet Napolitano
 Randy Parraz, civil rights and labor activist, attorney

Polling

Debates 
Debates were planned for:
 Friday, July 9, 2010, in Phoenix, to be televised on KTVK Channel 3
 Wednesday, July 21, 2010, in Yuma, to be radio broadcast on NPR's Yuma affiliate, KAWC
 Thursday, August 5, 2010, in Tucson, to be televised on KUAT

Results

General election

Candidates 
 Rodney Glassman (D), City Councilor of Tucson
 Jerry Joslyn (G), businessman
 John McCain (R), incumbent U.S. Senator
 David Nolan (L), former Chairman of the Libertarian Party and inventor of the Nolan Chart

Campaign 
After spending over $20million during the primaries, McCain still had more than $1million cash on hand after the primary election. Glassman criticized McCain on women's issues. In August 2010, Glassman released a TV advertisement called "Arizona First."

Debates 
 September 26: All four candidates on KTVK-TV in Phoenix. It ran without commercial interruption from 6pm to 7pm

Predictions

Polling

Fundraising

Results

References

External links 
 Arizona Secretary of State – Elections
 U.S. Congress candidates for Arizona at Project Vote Smart
 Arizona U.S. Senate from OurCampaigns.com
 Campaign contributions from Open Secrets
 2010 Arizona Senate Election graph of multiple polls from Pollster.com
 Election 2010: Arizona Senate from Rasmussen Reports
 2010 Arizona Senate Race from Real Clear Politics
 2010 Arizona Senate Race from CQ Politics
 Race profile from The New York Times
Debates
 Arizona Senate Republican Primary Debate, C-SPAN, July 16, 2010
 Arizona Senate Republican Primary Debate, C-SPAN, July 17, 2010
 Arizona Senate Debate, C-SPAN, September 26, 2010
Official campaign websites (Archived)

 Rodney Glassman for U.S. Senate
 John McCain for U.S. Senate

2010 Arizona elections
Arizona
2010
John McCain